Bansi Chandragupta (1924–1981) was an Indian art director and production designer, regarded among the greatest of art directors of Indian film industry. He won Filmfare Best Art Direction Award thrice, for Seema in 1972, for Do Jhoot in 1976 and for Chakra in 1982. He was awarded Evening Standard British Film Award posthumously for "best technical/artistic achievement" in 1983. He was born in 1924 in Sialkot, Punjab, British India and died on 27 June 1981 in Brookhaven, New York, United States.

Chandragupta is most well known as art director/production designer of movies directed by Satyajit Ray. He also worked with renowned film directors like Jean Renoir, Mrinal Sen, Shyam Benegal, Basu Chatterjee, Ismail Merchant, James Ivory and Aparna Sen.

Early life
Bansi Chandragupta was born at Sialkot in Pakistan. Chandragupta's family moved from Pakistan to Kashmir when he was a young boy. Here he met painter Shubho Tagore, on whose advice Chandragupta moved to Calcutta to pursue his ambition in painting. He spent most of his working life in this city.

Career
After a few stints in Bengali commercial films, Chandragupta got a chance to work as art director in Jean Renoir's movie The River (1951). Here he worked closely with production designer Eugène Lourié and learned the craft of film designing. During the shooting of this movie, he met Satyajit Ray who asked him to join a group of film enthusiasts that included Ray, RP Gupta, Chidananda Dasgupta, Harisadhan Dasgupta and others, to form the Calcutta Film Society.

Later, Ray asked Chandragupta to be set designer for his film Pather Panchali. This collaboration sustained till Shatranj Ke Khilari (1977). Some of the best examples of Chandragupta's work are from the Ray films: Pather Panchali, Jalsaghar and Charulata.

Apart from Ray's films, best works of Chandragupta's works are visible in 36 Chowringhee Lane by Aparna Sen, Umrao Jaan by Muzzafar Ali and Chakra by Rabindra Dharamraj. All these were shot in 1981, the year Chandragupta died of a heart attack in New York.

36 Chowringhee Lane was dedicated to Chandragupta.

Filmography

Production Designer
 Akaler Sandhane (1980) directed by Mrinal Sen
 Manzil (1979) directed by Basu Chatterjee
 Mahatma and the Mad Boy (1974) directed by Ismail Merchant
 27 Down (1974)
 Pratidwandi (1972) directed by Satyajit Ray
 Seemabaddha (1971) directed by Satyajit Ray
 Aranyer Din Ratri (1970) directed by Satyajit Ray
 The Guru (1969) directed by James Ivory
 Goopy Gyne Bagha Byne (1968) directed by Satyajit Ray
 Chiriyakhana (1967) directed by Satyajit Ray
 Nayak (1966) directed by Satyajit Ray
 Akash Kusum (1965) directed by Mrinal Sen
 Kapurush (1965) directed by Satyajit Ray
 Mahapurush (1965) directed by Satyajit Ray
 Charulata (1964) directed by Satyajit Ray
 Mahanagar (1963) directed by Satyajit Ray
 Abhijan (1962) directed by Satyajit Ray
 Kanchenjungha (1962) directed by Satyajit Ray
 Rabindranath Tagore (1961) directed by Satyajit Ray
 Teen Kanya (1961) directed by Satyajit Ray
 Baishey Shravana' (1960) directed by Mrinal Sen
 Devi (1960) directed by Satyajit Ray
 Apur Sansar (1959) directed by Satyajit Ray
 Jalsaghar (1958) directed by Satyajit Ray
 Maya Bazaar (1958)
 Parash Pathar (1958) directed by Satyajit Ray
 Aparajito (1956) directed by Satyajit Ray
 Pather Panchali (1955) directed by Satyajit Ray

Art Director
 Tarang (1984) directed by Kumar Sahani
 36 Chowringhee Lane (1981) directed by Aparna Sen
 Chakra (1981) directed by Rabindra Dharmaraj
 Kalyug (1981) directed by Shyam Benegal
 Umrao Jaan (1981) directed by Muzaffar Ali
 Tumhari Kassam (1978)
 Mukti (1977)
 Shatranj Ke Khilari (1977)
 Trimurti (1974)
 Aaj Ki Taaza Khabar (1973)
 Jangal Mein Mangal (1972)
 Piya Ka Ghar (1972) directed by Basu Chatterjee
 Paraya Dhan (1971)
 Balika Badhu (1967)
 Chiriyakhana (1967) directed by Satyajit Ray
 Pather Panchali (1955) directed by Satyajit Ray
 The River (1951) directed by Jean Renoir

Set Decorator
 Balika Badhu (1967)
 Chiriyakhana'' (1967)

Miscellaneous Crew
Hullabaloo Over Georgie and Bonnie's Pictures (1978)

References

External links
 
 Bansi Chanragupta at Upperstall

Indian art directors
Filmfare Awards winners
1924 births
1981 deaths
Indian production designers
20th-century Indian designers
People from Sialkot District
Male artists from Punjab, India
Indian expatriates in the United States
20th-century Indian male artists